Gliding motility is a type of translocation used by microorganisms that is independent of propulsive structures such as flagella, pili, and fimbriae. Gliding allows microorganisms to travel along the surface of low aqueous films. The mechanisms of this motility are only partially known.

Twitching motility also allows microorganisms to travel along a surface, but this type of movement is jerky and uses pili as its means of transport. Bacterial gliding is a type of gliding motility that can also use pili for propulsion. 

The speed of gliding varies between organisms, and the reversal of direction is seemingly regulated by some sort of internal clock. For example the apicomplexans are able to travel at fast rates between 1–10 µm/s. In contrast Myxococcus xanthus bacteria glide at a rate of 0.08 µm/s.

Cell-invasion and gliding motility have TRAP (thrombospondin-related anonymous protein), a surface protein, as a common molecular basis that is both essential for infection and locomotion of the invasive apicomplexan parasite. Micronemes are secretory organelles on the apical surface of the apicomplexans used for gliding motility.

In the diagram above, right:

Types of motility

Bacterial gliding is a process of motility whereby a bacterium can move under its own power. Generally, the process occurs whereby the bacterium moves along a surface in the general direction of its long axis. Gliding may occur via distinctly different mechanisms, depending on the type of bacterium. This type of movement has been observed in phylogenetically diverse bacteria such as cyanobacteria, myxobacteria, cytophaga, flavobacteria, and mycoplasma.

Bacteria move in response to varying climates, water content, presence of other organisms, and firmness of surfaces or media. Gliding has been observed in a wide variety of phyla, and though the mechanisms may vary between bacteria, it is currently understood that it takes place in environments with common characteristics, such as firmness and low-water, which enables the bacterium to still have motility in its surroundings. Such environments with low-water content include biofilms, soil or soil crumbs in tilth, and microbial mats.

Purpose
Gliding, as a form of motility, appears to allow for interactions between bacteria, pathogenesis, and increased social behaviours. It may play an important role in biofilm formation, bacterial virulence, and chemosensing.

Swarming motility
Swarming motility occurs on softer semi-solid and solid surfaces (which usually involves movement of a bacterial population in a coordinated fashion via quorum sensing, using flagella to propel them), or twitching motility on solid surfaces (which involves extension and retraction of type IV pili to drag the bacterium forward).

Proposed mechanisms
The mechanism of gliding might differ between species. Examples of such mechanisms include:  

 Motor proteins found within the inner membrane of the bacteria utilize a proton-conducting channel to transduce a mechanical force to the cell surface. The movement of the cytoskeletal microfilaments causes a mechanical force which travels to the adhesion complexes on the substrate to move the cell forward. Motor and regulatory proteins that convert intracellular motion into mechanical forces like traction force have been discovered to be a conserved class of intracellular motors in bacteria that have been adapted to produce cell motility.
 A-motility (adventurous motility) as a proposed type of gliding motility, involving transient adhesion complexes fixed to the substrate while the organism moves forward. For example, in Myxococcus xanthus, a social bacterium.
 Ejection or secretion of a polysaccharide slime from nozzles at either end of the cell body.
 Energized nano-machinery or large macromolecular assemblies located on the bacterium's cell body.
 "Focal adhesion complexes" and "treadmilling" of surface adhesins distributed along the cell body.
 The gliding motility of Flavobacterium johnsoniae uses a helical track superficially similar to M. xanthus, but via a different mechanism. Here the adhesin SprB is propelled along the cell surface (spiraling from pole to pole), pulling the bacterium along 25 times faster than M. xanthus. Flavobacterium johnsoniae move via a screw-like mechanism and are powered by a proton motive force.

See also
 Extracellular polymeric substance
 Microneme
 Mucilage

References

Cell movement